Coleophora kashkaella is a moth of the family Coleophoridae. It is found in Afghanistan.

The larvae feed on Artemisia badhysi and Artemisia kopetdaghensis. They feed on the leaves of their host plant.

References

kashkaella
Fauna of Afghanistan
Moths described in 1967
Moths of Asia